The shendyt (šnḏyt, Schenti, Schent, Shent, Skent) was a type of loincloth similar to a skirt. It was a kilt-like garment worn in ancient Egypt. It was made of cloth and was worn around the waist, typically extending to above the knees. Shendyts are depicted on pharaohs, deities, and commoners in a variety of situations in Egyptian artwork.

The shendyt may have been an adaptation of early hunting skirts which allowed freedom of movement for the wearer.  Members of the military wore a version of the shendyt, as they too would need freedom of movement in battle. Shendyts worn by those of higher rank or class would have been made of finer materials.

Gallery 
The following files are the variations of Schenti worn in ancient Egyptian society.

References

External links

 Appearance of the shendyt in Egyptian culture
 Statue image of King Men-Kau-Re wearing the shendyt kilt 
 Group Statue of Ramesses III wearing the shendyt kilt with Horus and Seth 

Middle Eastern clothing
Skirts
Ancient Egypt